Ágúst Ásgeirsson (born 15 July 1952) is an Icelandic middle-distance runner. He competed in the men's 1500 metres at the 1976 Summer Olympics.

References

External links
 

1952 births
Living people
Athletes (track and field) at the 1976 Summer Olympics
Icelandic male middle-distance runners
Icelandic male steeplechase runners
Olympic athletes of Iceland
Place of birth missing (living people)